Nanon is a 1924 German silent historical film directed by Hanns Schwarz and starring Agnes Esterhazy, Harry Liedtke, and Hanni Weisse. It is based on the operetta Nanon by Richard Genée with a libretto by F Zell.

The film's sets were designed by the Hungarian art director .

The film was remade in 1938 as a sound film of the same name.

Cast

References

Bibliography

External links

1924 films
1920s historical films
German historical films
Films of the Weimar Republic
German silent feature films
Films directed by Hanns Schwarz
Films set in France
Films set in the 17th century
Films based on operettas
German black-and-white films
1920s German films